Peter Cooper Wing Commander, RAF, (1929–2007), is an English author who wrote witty detective stories and light verse under the name "Colin Curzon". His "Not tonight Josephine" was anthologized by J. M. Cohen.

Publications 
The Case of the Eighteenth Ostrich (1940)

Flying Wild (1941)

The Body in the Barrage Balloon (1942)

References

English crime writers
2007 deaths
Year of birth missing
English male writers